Mirza Jelečak (born 2 March 1983) is a Bosnian-born Swedish football manager and former player who serves as head coach at Akropolis IF.

Club career
Jelečak was born in Sarajevo. He previously played for Örebro SK, Landskrona BoIS, Dalkurd FF and FC Väsby United.

International career
Jelečak has represented the Sweden U18 team and the Sweden U19 team.

Personal life
He holds both a Swedish and a Bosnian citizenship.

References

External links

1983 births
Living people
Footballers from Sarajevo
Association football midfielders
Bosnia and Herzegovina footballers
Swedish footballers
Sweden youth international footballers
Örebro SK players
Landskrona BoIS players
Dalkurd FF players
AFC Eskilstuna players
IK Sirius Fotboll players
Allsvenskan players
Superettan players
Ettan Fotboll players
Swedish football managers
IK Sirius Fotboll managers